John Calvin Whitehead (September 7, 1924 – January 19, 2002) was an American football coach and college athletics administrator.  He served as the head football coach at Lehigh University from 1976 to 1985, compiling a record of 75–38–2.  His 1977 team at Lehigh won the NCAA Division II Championship and his 1979 was the runner-up in the NCAA Division I-AA Championship playoffs.  Whitehead was born on September 7, 1924 in Summit Hill, Pennsylvania.  He died on January 20, 2002.

Head coaching record

College

References

External links
 

1924 births
2002 deaths
Lehigh Mountain Hawks athletic directors
Lehigh Mountain Hawks football coaches
High school football coaches in New York (state)
High school football coaches in Pennsylvania
East Stroudsburg University of Pennsylvania alumni
People from Carbon County, Pennsylvania
Sportspeople from Pennsylvania